Charles Godfrey Gunther (April 7, 1822 – January 22, 1885) was a Democratic Mayor of New York City from 1864 until 1866.

Early life
Gunther was born in New York on April 7, 1822, into a family of recent immigrants from Germany. His father, Christian G. Gunther, was a wealthy fur merchant, and Gunther would eventually join the family business.

Gunther was also a volunteer firefighter for many years.

Political career
Gunther was active in Tammany Hall politics since his teenage years.

In 1861 he ran for Mayor, but lost to Republican George Opdyke in an election fraught with Civil War complications. In 1863 Gunther ran again and was elected, serving his two-year term from 1864 until 1866.

Later life
After leaving politics, Gunther became a railroad executive, working in that capacity until his death in New York on January 22, 1885.

He was buried in Brooklyn's Green-Wood Cemetery.

See also
German Americans

Notes

References

Mayors of New York City
American people of German descent
1822 births
1885 deaths
Burials at Green-Wood Cemetery
19th-century American politicians
New York (state) Democrats